Diuncus haberkorni, is a species of weevil found in India, Sri Lanka, Bangladesh, Taiwan, Java, Japan, Malaysia, New Guinea, South Korea, Taiwan, Thailand, and Vietnam. It is also imported to African countried such as South Africa, and Tanzania.

Description
Body length is about 1.9 to 2.8 mm. The elytral summit is armed by two pairs of large denticles. Pronotum as long as wide where the basal half is punctate. Elytral declivity weakly bisulcate. Elytral interstriae 1, 3 to 6 are flat to weakly convex. This gives the finely sculptured appearance for the declivity.

A polyphagous species, it is found from many host plants.

Host plants

 Artocarpus dadah
 Coffea liberica
 Dalbergia latifolia
 Gluta curtisii
 Eugenia jambolana
 Falcataria moluccana
 Mangifera indica
 Neolitsea konishii
 Parkia speciosa
 Piper
 Salix tetrasperma
 Shorea maxwelliana 
 Shorea ovata 
 Shorea robusta
 Swietenia mahagoni
 Tectona grandis 
 Terminalia myriocarpa
 Theobroma cacao
 Toona sinensis
 Tristania whiteana
 Turpinia pomifera
 Vitex pubescens
 Zelkova serrata

References 

Curculionidae
Insects of Sri Lanka
Beetles described in 1866